Bologoye is a town and the administrative center of Bologovsky District in Tver Oblast, Russia, as well as a major railway hub. It is located approximately halfway between Moscow and St. Petersburg on the railway route connecting the two cities. Population:

Etymology
The name of the town derives from the name of nearby Lake Bologoye.

History

The first mention of Bologoye in historic records dates back to 1495, which is considered its year of foundation. In the course of the administrative reform carried out in 1708 by Peter the Great, Bologoye was included into the Ingermanland Governorate (known since 1710 as the St. Petersburg Governorate). In 1727, a separate Novgorod Governorate was split off. In 1770, it became a part of Valdaysky Uyezd of Novgorod Viceroyalty. In 1796, the viceroyalty was transformed into Novgorod Governorate.

In 1851, Bologoye became a station of the Moscow – Saint Petersburg Railway. In the second half of the 19th century, the Rybinsk–Pskov–Vindava railway passed through Bologoye, turning it into a large railway junction. Railway-related industries have contributed significantly to the town's growth.

On June 3, 1917, Bologoye was granted town status. Between April 1, 1919 and October 1920, the administrative center of the uyezd was transferred from Valday to Bologoye, but soon after it was moved back to Valday.

In August 1927, the governorates and uyezds were abolished. Bologovsky District, with the administrative center in Bologoye, was established within Borovichi Okrug of Leningrad Oblast effective October 1, 1927. It included parts of former Valdaysky and Borovichsky Uyezds. On July 23, 1930, the okrugs were abolished and the districts were directly subordinated to the oblast. On January 29, 1935, Bologovsky District was transferred to newly established Kalinin Oblast.

On November 27, 2009, the town was the site of a derailment of an express train on the Moscow–St. Petersburg railway.

Administrative and municipal status
Within the framework of administrative divisions, Bologoye serves as the administrative center of Bologovsky District. As an administrative division, it is, together with ten rural localities, incorporated within Bologovsky District as Bologoye Urban Settlement. As a municipal division, this administrative unit also has urban settlement status and is a part of Bologovsky Municipal District.

Culture and recreation
Bologoye hosts the Nikolay Dubravitsky Bologoye District Museum which specializes in the history of Bologovsky District.

Economy

Industry
The industry of Bologoye mainly serves the railways. Additionally, there are a pipe production factory, a glass-making factory, a metal production plant, as well as enterprises of construction and food industries.

Transportation
Bologoye is a major railway hub, where four railway lines cross. One connects Moscow and St. Petersburg, while the other three connect the town with Rybinsk via Bezhetsk and Sonkovo, with Pskov via Valday and Staraya Russa, and with Velikiye Luki via Andreapol. There is passenger traffic along all these lines.

Bologoye has access to the M10 Highway, which connects Moscow and St. Petersburg. There are local roads as well.

Climate

References

Sources

External links
  Official website of Bologoye

1495 establishments in Europe
15th-century establishments in Russia
Cities and towns in Tver Oblast
Populated places established in the 1490s
Valdaysky Uyezd